Davidson's Mains is a former village and now a district in the north-west of Edinburgh, Scotland. It is adjacent to the districts of Barnton, Cramond, Silverknowes, Blackhall and Corbiehill/House O'Hill. It was absorbed into Edinburgh as part of the boundary changes in 1920 and is part of the EH4 postcode area.

Locals sometimes abbreviate the name to D'Mains.

Etymology 
The place is named after William Davidson, a wealthy merchant who bought Muirhouse, east of the district, in 1776. A mains is Lowland Scots for an estate farm or home farm.

Prior to the 19th century, it was known as Muttonhole. Locals continued to use this name until at least 1860. The origin of this name is unknown, though it perhaps refers to the local sheep farming industry. 
Muttonhole could also be derived from mort-toun-hole, another name for a "murder hole" (drowning pit).

History

The original village runs east-west and is still identifiable as the original village, with a series of modest cottages on each side of the road. Quality Street was added in 1827, designed by James Gillespie Graham. The church on Quality Street was built as Cramond Free Church in 1843 and is by David Cousin. The railway arrived late in 1894 but spurred villa development to the north and north-west.

Description 
Within the district there is a variety of shops and businesses, ranging from cobblers to large supermarkets, as well as food outlets of various kinds. The district is also served by four churches, a Tesco, 2 veterinary surgery, a doctor's surgery, two dental surgeries, the Corbie and other takeaways, a primary school and a Greggs. The state secondary school that serves the area is the Royal High School.  Davidson's Mains Park is near the high school which has a play park and a football pitch.

Public Transport
Davidson's Mains railway station closed in 1951 prior to the Beeching cuts due to underuse. The area lay beyond the Edinburgh tram network.
 
The district is currently served by two bus routes run by Lothian Buses: the 21, which travels to the Gyle Centre via Clermiston and to Leith in the other direction; and the 41, which travels from Cramond to Morningside.

References

External links
 Davidson's Mains Parish Church (Church of Scotland)
 Church of the Holy Cross Davidson's Mains (Scottish Episcopal)

Areas of Edinburgh